Irena Klepfisz (born April 17, 1941) is a Jewish lesbian author, academic and activist.

Early life
Klepfisz was born in the Warsaw Ghetto on April 17, 1941, the daughter of Michał Klepfisz, a member of the Jewish Labour Bund (Yiddish: der algemeyner yidisher arbeter bund), and his wife, Rose Klepfisz (née Shoshana Perczykow; 1914-2016). In late April 1943, when she had just turned two years old, her father was killed on the second day of the Warsaw Ghetto Uprising (Yiddish: varshever geto oyfshtand).

Earlier in 1943, Klepfisz's father had smuggled Irena and her mother out of the ghetto; Irena was placed in a Catholic orphanage, while her mother, using false papers, worked as a maid for a Polish family. After the uprising, her mother retrieved her from the orphanage and fled with her into the Polish countryside, where they survived the Second World War by hiding and concealing their Jewish identities, aided by Polish peasants. After the war, the remaining family moved briefly to Łódź before moving to Sweden in 1946. Irena and her mother immigrated to the United States in 1949.

Education
Klepfisz attended City College of New York, and studied with distinguished Yiddish linguist Max Weinreich, a founder of the YIVO Institute for Jewish Research. Klepfisz graduated CCNY with honors in English and Yiddish.

In 1963, she attended the University of Chicago to do graduate work in English Literature. Irena Klepfisz received a Ph.D. in English in 1970.

Irena Klepfisz has taught English, Yiddish, and Women's Studies.  In 2018, she retired from her position as a professor at Barnard in New York City.

Yiddishist
Today Klepfisz is known as a Yiddishist, but her  (mame-loshn, literally "mother tongue") was Polish; as a child she also learned Swedish. She began to learn Yiddish in Łódź in elementary school after the Second World War. She learned English after emigrating to the United States. In The Tribe of Dina: A Jewish Women's Anthology, which she co-edited with Melanie Kaye/Kantrowitz, Klepfisz describes the experience, up to age 16 or 17,  of having "no language in which I was completely rooted".

Irena is well known for her translations of Yiddish poets Kadya Molodowsky and Fradl Shtok.

Activism
Klepfisz has worked as an activist in feminist, lesbian, and secular Jewish communities. She is also co-founder of The Jewish Women's Committee to End the Occupation of the West Bank and Gaza (JWCEO). Along with Nancy Bereano, Evelyn T. Beck, Bernice Mennis, Adrienne Rich, and Melanie Kaye/Kantrowitz, Irena Klepfisz was a member of Di Vilde Chayes (English: The Wild Beasts), a Jewish feminist group that examined and responded to political issues in the Middle East, as well as antisemitism.

Publishing

Klepfisz began publishing her poems in 1971. She was a founding editor of Conditions, a feminist magazine emphasizing the writing of lesbians, and also was a co-editor of The Tribe of Dina: A Jewish Women's Anthology (the other co-editor was Melanie Kaye/Kantrowitz). Klepfisz has also been a contributor to the Jewish feminist magazine Bridges, and wrote the introduction to Found Treasures: Stories by Yiddish Women Writers.

She also authored an essay collection, Dreams of an Insomniac: Jewish Feminist Essays, Speeches and Diatribes, published by The Eighth Mountain Press. She is the author of A Few Words in the Mother Tongue: Poems Selected and New (with an introduction by Adrienne Rich), published by The Eighth Mountain Press, which was nominated for a Lamda Prize in Poetry in 1990.
In the Fall of 2022, Wesleyan University Press published Klepfisz’s Her Birth and Later Years: Poems New and Collected 1971-2021, which was named a finalist for The 2022 National Jewish Book Award in Poetry.

References

External 

 Video interview with Yiddish Book Center

1941 births
Living people
American feminist writers
American people of Polish-Jewish descent
Feminist studies scholars
Jewish feminists
Lesbian feminists
American lesbian writers
Lesbian Jews
Polish lesbian writers
Jewish American writers
Jewish women writers
Yiddish-language poets
Warsaw Ghetto inmates
Polish essayists
Polish women essayists
20th-century Polish poets
Secular Jews
Yiddish–English translators
Barnard College faculty
City College of New York alumni
University of Chicago alumni
American women essayists
Polish women poets
20th-century translators
20th-century American women writers
20th-century American essayists
Lesbian academics
20th-century Polish women
21st-century American Jews
21st-century American women writers
People from Warsaw